Neobaryssinus altissimus is a species of beetle in the family Cerambycidae. It was described by Berkov and Monne in 2010.

References

Acanthocinini
Beetles described in 2010